Fox Digital Entertainment was an American digital content, mobile applications, and video game developer and publisher owned by 20th Century Fox (later rebranded as 20th Century Studios).

History
Fox Digital Entertainment was formed in 2010 and took on many of the projects related to 21st Century Fox properties from Fox Interactive, 20th Century Fox Games (now known as 20th Century Games since 2022) and Fox Mobile Entertainment, when that was sold to the Jesta Group and was renamed Jesta Digital.

Projects
It was primarily involved with 20th Century Studios and Metro-Goldwyn-Mayer properties such as Family Guy, The Simpsons, Ice Age, James Bond, Predator, Rio, Sons of Anarchy, and X-Men. They have been involved in applications such as FOX 4D, Own The Moments, Skyfall Gun Barrel and The Wolverine Second Screen. They have also been involved in video games such as The Chronicles of Narnia: The Voyage of the Dawn Treader, Family Guy: The Quest for Stuff, The Simpsons: Tapped Out, and Predators.

List of mobile applications
See List of video games for mobile video games

List of video games

References

Video game companies of the United States
Video game development companies
Video game publishers
The Walt Disney Company subsidiaries
American companies established in 2010
Entertainment companies established in 2010
Mass media companies established in 2010
Video game companies established in 2010
American companies disestablished in 2017
Entertainment companies disestablished in 2017
Mass media companies disestablished in 2017
Video game companies disestablished in 2017
Defunct video game companies of the United States
Former News Corporation subsidiaries